Edson Ramalho dos Santos (born March 15, 1978 in Santa Cruz do Monte Castelo), or simply Ramalho, is a Brazilian defensive midfield. He currently plays for Santa Cruz.

Career

External links
Ramalho at playmakerstats.com (English version of ogol.com.br)

1978 births
Living people
Brazilian footballers
Brazilian expatriate footballers
Santa Cruz Futebol Clube players
Sport Club do Recife players
Association football forwards